Cathedral is a mixtape by American rapper Curren$y and producer Chase N. Cashe. It was released for online download on August 5, 2015.

Track listing
All tracks are produced by Chase N. Cashe.

References

2015 mixtape albums
Currensy albums